Daing Khin Khin (also spelt Dine Khin Khin, born Khin Khin Gyi, circa 1863 – April 1882), also known as Mi Khingyi, was a noble lady and royal concubine of Thibaw Min, the last monarch of the Konbaung dynasty, and the subject of a well-known Burmese history about a queen's attempts to enforce fidelity on a reigning monarch.

Family
Daing Khin Khin was a daughter of the Duke and Duchess of Kenni. She was later adopted by Daingwun Mingyi and Daingwun Mingyi Kadaw, who was the sister of the Duke of Kenni, because they did not have any biological children. Her grandfather was Khanpat Mingyi, minister of Khanpat.

Life with Thibaw
Taungthaman Le-sar Maung Pe Nge and Maung Maung Toke were close confidants of King Thibaw. In hopes of gaining the king's favor, Maung Maung Toke (who later become the Lord of Yanaung) introduced the 17-year-old Daing Khin Khin to Thibaw in September 1880, following the birth of his first daughter by his chief queen Supayalat. After the introduction, Thibaw sought to wed Daing Khin Khin, but he kept Supayalat uninformed of this during her second pregnancy. Maung Pe Nge was also secretly in love with Daing Khin Khin. Her parents had tacitly agreed to their marriage, but at the command of King Thibaw he instead helped to arrange affairs between her and the king.

Supayalat finally learned what was happening. On the advice of Maung Maung Toke, Thibaw ignored the queen's objections and informed her of his intention to wed Daing Khin Khin and give her the high-ranking title "Queen of the Northern Palace". This threw Supayalat, who wanted a monogamous relationship, into a fit of rage. It was the first time that the king had disagreed with her.

Soon Maung Maung Toke, Maung Pe Nge, Daing Khin Khin and her family were arrested by order of the Hluttaw Council and charged with attempts to seize the throne. Maung Maung Toke committed suicide. Maung Pe Nge was sent to Bhamo and executed, but first, in April 1882, he managed to send a poem to Daing Khin Khin confessing his love and asking her to observe the obsequies for him. Unfortunately, she was already dead at the hands of the executioner, despite being pregnant with Thibaw Min's child. Kinwun Mingyi U Kaung had appealed to Supayalat for mercy on the basis that the country would be ruined if the king's only son was killed, but the queen had remained unmoved.

In popular culture
Daing Khin Khin is the subject of Seint's popular eponymous novel Daing Khin Khin, first published in 1976.

See also
Konbaung dynasty
Thibaw Min
Supayalat

References

Konbaung dynasty
19th-century Burmese women
1882 deaths